PRS Norway (established 2016) is a Norwegian sports association for field based long range and precision shooting competitions with fullbore rifles. It is the Norwegian representative of the International Precision Rifle Federation, and can be viewed as the Norwegian version of the American PRS Series. Norwegian competitions are arranged in a cup format similar to the U.S. version

See also 
 International T-Class Confederation (ITCC)
 Precision Rifle Series
 International Confederation of Fullbore Rifle Associations (ICFRA)

Other Norwegian shooting sport associations 
 Dynamic Sports Shooting Norway
 National Rifle Association of Norway
 Norwegian Association of Hunters and Anglers
 Norwegian Benchrest Association
 Norwegian Biathlon Association
 Norwegian Black Poweder Association
 Norwegian Metallic Silhouette Association
 Norwegian Shooting Association

References 

2016 establishments in Norway
Sports organisations of Norway